Anna Maria (Horwood) Falconbridge (1769-1835), was the first English woman to give a narrative account of experiences in Africa.

She was born in All Saints Lane Bristol, England in 1769. Her father Charles was a local clock maker.   After her parents’ death, she married Alexander Falconbridge surgeon and slave ship surgeon turned abolitionist on 16 October 1788 aged 19,  in Easton in Gordano, against her family's and friends' wishes. After their marriage Anna Maria accompanied her husband to Sierra Leone twice. Once there she “described her experiences in a series of lively, informative letters”.1 Later she had the letters published. In her work Narrative of Two Voyages she defends the slave trade and ridicules her abolitionist-supporting dead husband.

Visits to Africa
During Anna Maria's first trip to Africa, she visited a slave-trading fort, Bunce Island, in the Sierra Leone River. It would seem that  Anna Maria, came from a family that took part in the slave trade but she was originally sympathetic to the plight of the slaves. Dr Alexander had made 4 slaving voyages as ships' surgeon but became increasingly opposed to the trade. He would not allow his wife to stay with the traders on Bance Island but insisted she live on a small boat, although Anna Maria accompanied Mr. Falconbridge on some of his visits to the main land. “During her stay Anna Maria observed all she could of the country and its people, their customs, religion, and economy, and wrote about what she saw.”2

On Anna Maria's second trip to Africa she travelled with people who had been sent to form a colony by bringing freed slaves to the settlement. Falconbridge was appointed commercial agent, leaving his small medical practice for the good salary offered by the Sierra Leone Company (SLC).  The settlement was named Freetown. “More than a thousand settlers”3 came to Freetown, arriving at the start of the rainy season. Hundreds died because there was no shelter for them when they arrived, but Anna Maria kept her health and continued to write, becoming ill for just a short time. Her husband was dismissed by the directors of the Sierra Leone Company just hours before his death, and while his excessive drinking was used as an excuse it would seem that he and others dismissed by the company were used as scapegoats. Other dismissals included Charles Horwood - brother of Anna Maria, and her second husband Isaac DuBois.  Alexander died on 19 December 1792 and is believed to be buried in the area of Freetown; the place was not recorded. His brother William who had accompanied them on the last voyage had died the previous year of "fever" contracted on Bance Island and is most likely buried there also. Falcon Bridge Point was named for Dr Alexander Falconbridge.

Later life
After her husband's death Anna Maria returned to London. (She remarried on 7 January 1793 in Freetown, Sierra Leone within a few weeks of Alexander's death,  to Isaac DuBois also an employee of the S.L. Coy.)  Once in London Anna Maria demanded from the directors of the Sierra Leone Company money she claimed was owed to her late husband. The company denied her claims (paperwork was conveniently lost). Anna Maria published letters denouncing the company. “Three editions of her Narrative of Two Voyages to the River Sierra Leone during the Years 1791–1792–1793 appeared during 1794 and 1795”. 4 The letters that Anna Maria wrote were not originally made to be published. The original purpose of them seems to be for her own personal records of what happened in her travels.

Anna Maria and Isaac DuBois had one son Francis Blake DuBois, born 1801 England (named for Colonel Francis Blake of the Northumberland Fencible Infantry). The family eventually moved to the Virgin Islands where their descendants remain to this day. Anna Maria died on 7 July 1835, New York, United States of America.

Citations
1. Christopher Fyfe, “Falconbridge, Anna Maria (b. 1769, d. in or after 1802?),” in Oxford Dictionary of National Biography, online ed., ed. Lawrence Goldman, Oxford: OUP, http://0-www.oxforddnb.com.library.svsu.edu/view/article/9105
2. Bivb
3. Bibv
4. Bibv

External sources
Narrative of Two Voyages to the River Sierra Leone, During the Years 1791-1792-1793 (Full text, partial free access)

References

African slave trade
English non-fiction writers
1769 births
1835 deaths
British letter writers
18th-century English women writers